Jean Adebambo (1 July 1962 – 15 January 2009) was a British singer, best known for songs in the lovers rock genre. It is believed she died by suicide.

Biography
Jean Adebambo was born in Islington, London, to a Montserratian mother and a Nigerian father.  Her entry into the music business was by chance; she was invited to do a cover version of two records entitled "Again" and "Reunited" by Ital Records in the early 1980s, while she was studying to be a nurse.

She eventually met the Jamaican producer Leonard Chin, for whom she recorded the single "Paradise", and had a successful solo career, mainly recording for her own Ade J label.  A string of hits followed such as the singles "Reaching For A Goal", "Hardships of Life" and "Pipe Dreams".  Despite all the success, Adebambo quit the music industry and went back into the medical profession and became a health visitor in Bermondsey.

A successful lovers rock concert was held in 2008 at the Brixton Academy, where Adebambo was persuaded to perform and restart her music career; however, she was found dead at home in Leytonstone on 15 January 2009, aged 46.

A tribute concert was held on at Hackney Empire on Sunday 15 March 2009, with the aim of raising funds to help raise her two daughters.

Discography

Albums
Feelings (1983), Ade J
Off Key Loving (1985), Ade J

Singles
"Paradise" (1980), Santic
"Reaching for a Goal" (1981), Third World
"Say That You Love Me" (1981), Ade J
"Pipe Dreams" (1982), Ade J
"Hardships of Life" (1983), Ade J
"Tell Me" (1983), Ade J
"I Like It" (1984), Ade J
"Never Before" (1984), Ade J
"I've Made Up My Mind" (1986), Ade J
"All the Way" (1987), Ade J
"Pain" (1987), Now Generation
"Never Gonna Give You Up" (1987), Pioneer International

References

External links
 

1962 births
2009 suicides
English people of Montserratian descent
English people of Nigerian descent
People from Islington (district)
20th-century Black British women singers
Lovers rock musicians
Suicides in Greater London